Enlil-nādin-aḫe, “Enlil gives a brother,” or Enlil-šuma-uṣur, “Enlil protect the son,” depending on the reading of –MU-ŠEŠ, ca. 1157—1155 BC (short chronology), was the 36th and final king of the Kassite or 3rd dynasty that had ruled over Babylon and the land known as Karduniash since perhaps around 1500 BC.

Biography

Shutruk-Nahhunte, king of Elam, had overrun Babylonia bringing Enlil-nādin-aḫe’s predecessor, Zababa-šuma-iddina’s brief rule to an end. He had then returned to Susa leaving his son, Kutir-Nahhunte, to govern. Enlil-nādin-aḫe was proclaimed king of “Sumer and Akkad”, and ruled for three years possibly in defiance of the occupying Elamite forces. A single kudurru, or boundary stone (pictured), detailing a royal land grant, an administrative text listing recipients of grain from Ur, and a couple of tablets from a small cache from the Merkes section of Babylon, all bear witness to his reign.

According to later chronicles, his short reign was brought to a dramatic close when he led a campaign against the Elamite forces and suffered a crushing defeat at the hands of Kutir-Nahhunte, who was possibly now the successor of Shutruk-Nahhunte. He was deported with the Kassite noblemen in chains to Susa accompanied by the booty pillaged from the various Babylonian temples, whose most notable example was the cult statue of Marduk, an act so sacrilegious to the Babylonians that it would forever cast Kutir-Nahhunte in infamy.

The memory of the disaster was preserved in the Akkadian liturgy in a prayer, presenting rituals in the third month Simanu. An invocation for the god of justice, Šamaš, recounts:

The so-called Chedor-laomer texts, from the Spartoli tablets collection in the British Museum, may make reference to this period, where Kutir-Nahhunte is represented by Kudur-lagamar. Kudur-lagamar is described as ruling in Babylon and overthrowing, or perhaps taking away Marduk. These are fragmentary second century BC texts, preserving traditions going back to perhaps the seventh century BC, relating how four successive kings, with cryptic ambiguous names, attacked Babylon.

The Marduk Prophecy, a vaticinium ex eventu (prophecy after the fact) composition of perhaps the Nabu-kudurri-uṣur I-(Nebuchadnezzar I) reign, ca. 1125 BC to 1103 BC, describes the dire consequences of the departure of the statue of Marduk, on the city of Babylon, where: “mad dogs roam the city biting citizens, friend attacks friend, the rich beg from the poor, brother eats brother, and the corpses block the city gates.”

Inscriptions

Notes

References

12th-century BC Babylonian kings
Kassite kings
12th-century BC rulers